The genera of the family Salticidae listed here are those that are extant and accepted by the World Spider Catalog . Assignment to subfamilies and clades is based on Maddison (2015), except where otherwise shown. Unless sources indicate otherwise, genera that were split after 2015 are given the same placements as the original genera listed in Maddison (2015).

Subfamily Onomastinae
Onomastinae Maddison, 2015
Onomastus Simon, 1900

Subfamily Asemoneinae
Asemoneinae Maddison, 2015
Asemonea O. Pickard-Cambridge, 1869
Goleba Wanless, 1980
Macopaeus Simon, 1900
Pandisus Simon, 1900

Subfamily Lyssomaninae
Lyssomaninae Blackwall, 1877
Chinoscopus Simon, 1901
Hindumanes Logunov, 2004, transferred from Asemoneinae to Lyssomaninae
Lyssomanes Hentz, 1845
Sumakuru Maddison, 2016

Subfamily Spartaeinae
Spartaeinae Wanless, 1984

Allococalodes Wanless, 1982
Amilaps Maddison, 2019
Brettus Thorell, 1895
Cocalodes Pocock, 1897
Cocalus C. L. Koch, 1846
Cucudeta Maddison, 2009
Cyrba Simon, 1876
Depreissia Lessert, 1942
Galianora Maddison, 2006
Gelotia Thorell, 1890
Holcolaetis Simon, 1886
Lapsamita Ruiz, 2013
Lapsias Simon, 1900
Meleon Wanless, 1984
Mintonia Wanless, 1984
Neobrettus Wanless, 1984
Paracyrba Żabka & Kovac, 1996
Phaeacius Simon, 1900
Portia Karsch, 1878
Soesiladeepakius Makhan, 2007
Sonoita Peckham & Peckham, 1903
Sparbambus Zhang, Woon & Li, 2006
Spartaeus Thorell, 1891
Tabuina Maddison, 2009
Taraxella Wanless, 1984
Thrandina Maddison, 2006
Veissella Wanless, 1984
Wanlessia Wijesinghe, 1992
Yaginumanis Wanless, 1984
Yamangalea Maddison, 2009

Subfamily Eupoinae
Eupoinae Maddison, 2015
Corusca Zhou & Li, 2013
Eupoa Żabka, 1985
Megaeupoa Lin & Li, 2020, considered related to Eupoa, so a possible member of Eupoinae
Sinoinsula Zhou & Li, 2013

Subfamily Hisponinae
Hisponinae Simon, 1901
Hispo Simon, 1886
Jerzego Maddison, 2014
Massagris Simon, 1900
Tomobella Szűts & Scharff, 2009
Tomocyrba Simon, 1900
Tomomingi Szűts & Scharff, 2009

Subfamily Salticinae
Salticinae Blackwall, 1841

Clade Amycoida
Amycoida Maddison & Hedin, 2003

Acragas Simon, 1900
Admesturius Galiano, 1988
Aillutticus Galiano, 1987
Amatorculus Ruiz & Brescovit, 2005
Amycus C. L. Koch, 1846
Anaurus Simon, 1900
Arachnomura Mello-Leitão, 1917
Arnoliseus Braul, 2002
Atelurius Simon, 1901
Atomosphyrus Simon, 1902
Attinella Banks, 1905
Attulus Simon, 1889, syn. Sitticus Simon, 1901
Banksetosa Chickering, 1946
Breda Peckham & Peckham, 1894
Capeta Ruiz & Brescovit, 2005
Carabella Chickering, 1946
Ceriomura Simon, 1901
Colonus F. O. Pickard-Cambridge, 1901
Corcovetella Galiano, 1975
Cotinusa Simon, 1900
Cylistella Simon, 1901
Cyllodania Simon, 1902
Druzia Ruiz & Brescovit, 2013
Encolpius Simon, 1900
Erica Peckham & Peckham, 1892
Fluda Peckham & Peckham, 1892
Frespera Braul & Lise, 2002
Gavarilla Ruiz & Brescovit, 2006
Gypogyna Simon, 1900
Hurius Simon, 1901
Hyetussa Simon, 1902, including Bredana Gertsch, 1936 and Micalula Strand, 1932
Hypaeus Simon, 1900
Jollas Simon, 1901
Letoia Simon, 1900
Macutula Ruiz, 2011
Maenola Simon, 1900
Mago O. Pickard-Cambridge, 1882
Martella Peckham & Peckham, 1892
Matinta Ruiz & Maddison, 2019
Nilakantha Peckham & Peckham, 1901
Noegus Simon, 1900
Nosferattus Ruiz & Brescovit, 2005
Orvilleus Chickering, 1946
Parafluda Chickering, 1946
Parathiodina Bryant, 1943
Proctonemesia Bauab & Soares, 1978
Sarinda Peckham & Peckham, 1892
Scopocira Simon, 1900
Scoturius Simon, 1901
Semiopyla Simon, 1901
Simonurius Galiano, 1988
Simprulla Simon, 1901
Sittisax Prószyński, 2017
Synemosyna Hentz, 1846
Tartamura Bustamante & Ruiz, 2017
Tanybelus Simon, 1902
Thiodina Simon, 1900
Titanattus Peckham & Peckham, 1885, including Agelista
Toloella Chickering, 1946
Tomis F. O. Pickard-Cambridge, 1901, syn. Pseudattulus Caporiacco, 1947
Urupuyu Ruiz & Maddison, 2015
Vinnius Simon, 1902
Zuniga Peckham & Peckham, 1892

Clade Salticoida
Salticoida Maddison & Hedin, 2003

Abracadabrella Żabka, 1991
Admestina Peckham & Peckham, 1888
Aelurillus Simon, 1884
Afraflacilla Berland & Millot, 1941
Afrobeata Caporiacco, 1941
Afromarengo Benjamin, 2004
Agobardus Keyserling, 1885
Agorioides Maddison & Szűts, 2019
Agorius Thorell, 1877
Ajaraneola Wesołowska & Russell-Smith, 2011
Akela Peckham & Peckham, 1896
Alcmena C. L. Koch, 1846
Alfenus Simon, 1902
Ansienulina Wesołowska, 2015
Allodecta Bryant, 1950
Amphidraus Simon, 1900
Anarrhotus Simon, 1902
Anasaitis Bryant, 1950
Anicius Chamberlin, 1925
Anokopsis Bauab & Soares, 1980
Antillattus Bryant, 1943
Aphirape C. L. Koch, 1850
Apricia Richardson, 2016
Araegeus Simon, 1901
Araneotanna Özdikmen & Kury, 2006
Arasia Simon, 1901
Artabrus Simon, 1902
Aruattus Logunov & Azarkina, 2008
Asaphobelis Simon, 1902, included in Coryphasia by Zhang & Maddison (2015)
Asaracus C. L. Koch, 1846
Ascyltus Karsch, 1878
Ashtabula Peckham & Peckham, 1894
Asianellus Logunov & Heciak, 1996
Astia L. Koch, 1879
Astilodes Żabka, 2009
Athamas O. Pickard-Cambridge, 1877
Attidops Banks, 1905
Augustaea Szombathy, 1915
Avarua Marples, 1955
Avitus Peckham & Peckham, 1896
Bacelarella Berland & Millot, 1941
Bagheera Peckham & Peckham, 1896
Ballus C. L. Koch, 1850
Balmaceda Peckham & Peckham, 1894
Barraina Richardson, 2013
Baryphas Simon, 1902
Bathippus Thorell, 1892
Bavia Simon, 1877
Baviola Simon, 1898
Bavirecta Kanesharatnam & Benjamin, 2018
Beata Peckham & Peckham, 1895
Belippo Simon, 1909
Belliena Simon, 1902
Bellota Peckham & Peckham, 1892
Bianor Peckham & Peckham, 1886, including Stichius Thorell, 1890
Bindax Thorell, 1892
Bocus Peckham & Peckham, 1892
Brancus Simon, 1902
Bristowia Reimoser, 1934
Bryantella Chickering, 1946
Bulolia Żabka, 1996
Burmattus Prószyński, 1992
Bythocrotus Simon, 1903
Canama Simon, 1903
Capidava Simon, 1902
Caribattus Bryant, 1950
Carrhotus Thorell, 1891
Cembalea Wesołowska, 1993
Cerionesta Simon, 1901
Chalcolecta Simon, 1884
Chalcolemia Zhang & Maddison, 2012
Chalcoscirtus Bertkau, 1880
Chalcotropis Simon, 1902
Chapoda Peckham & Peckham, 1896
Charippus Thorell, 1895
Cheliceroides Żabka, 1985
Cheliferoides F. O. Pickard-Cambridge, 1901
Chinattus Logunov, 1999
Chinophrys Zhang & Maddison, 2012
Chira Peckham & Peckham, 1896
Chirothecia Taczanowski, 1878
Chrysilla Thorell, 1887
Clynotis Simon, 1901
Cobanus F. O. Pickard-Cambridge, 1900, included in Sidusa by Zhang & Maddison (2015)
Coccorchestes Thorell, 1881
Colaxes Simon, 1900
Colyttus Thorell, 1891
Commoris Simon, 1902
Compsodecta Simon, 1903
Copocrossa Simon, 1901
Corambis Simon, 1901
Corticattus Zhang & Maddison, 2012
Coryphasia Simon, 1902
Corythalia C. L. Koch, 1850
Cosmophasis Simon, 1901
Curubis Simon, 1902
Cynapes Simon, 1900
Cytaea Keyserling, 1882
Damoetas Peckham & Peckham, 1886
Darwinneon Cutler, 1971
Dasycyptus Simon, 1902
Dendryphantes C. L. Koch, 1837
Descanso Peckham & Peckham, 1892
Detalik Wesołowska, 2021
Dexippus Thorell, 1891
Diolenius Thorell, 1870
Diplocanthopoda Abraham, 1925
Donaldius Chickering, 1946
Drizztius Edwards, 2015
Eburneana Wesołowska & Szűts, 2001
Echeclus Thorell, 1890
Echinussa Simon, 1901
Ecuadattus Zhang & Maddison, 2012
Edilemma Ruiz & Brescovit, 2006
Edwardsya Ruiz & Bustamante, 2016
Efate Berland, 1938
Emathis Simon, 1899
Emertonius Peckham & Peckham, 1892, included in Myrmarachne in 2015
Empanda Simon, 1903
Encymachus Simon, 1902
Enoplomischus Giltay, 1931
Epeus Peckham & Peckham, 1886
Epocilla Thorell, 1887
Erasinus Simon, 1899
Ergane L. Koch, 1881
Eris C. L. Koch, 1846
Euochin Prószyński, 2018
Euophrys C. L. Koch, 1834
Euryattus Thorell, 1881
Eustiromastix Simon, 1902
Evarcha Simon, 1902
Featheroides Peng, Yin, Xie & Kim, 1994
Festucula Simon, 1901
Foliabitus Zhang & Maddison, 2012
Frewena Richardson, 2013
Freya C. L. Koch, 1850
Frigga C. L. Koch, 1850
Fritzia O. Pickard-Cambridge, 1879
Fuentes Peckham & Peckham, 1894
Furculattus Balogh, 1980
Gastromicans Mello-Leitão, 1917
Gedea Simon, 1902
Ghelna Maddison, 1996
Goleta Peckham & Peckham, 1894
Gorgasella Chickering, 1946
Gramenca Rollard & Wesołowska, 2002
Habrocestoides Prószyński, 1992
Habrocestum Simon, 1876
Habronattus F. O. Pickard-Cambridge, 1901
Hakka Berry & Prószyński, 2001
Harmochirus Simon, 1885
Hasarina Schenkel, 1963
Hasarius Simon, 1871
Havaika Prószyński, 2002
Helicius Żabka, 1981
Heliophanillus Prószyński, 1989
Heliophanus C. L. Koch, 1833
Helpis Simon, 1901
Helvetia Peckham & Peckham, 1894
Hentzia Marx, 1883
Heratemita Strand, 1932
Hermosa Peckham & Peckham, 1892 (syn. Myrmavola Prószyński, 2016), included in  Myrmarachne in 2015
Hermotimus Simon, 1903
Holoplatys Simon, 1885
Huntiglennia Żabka & Gray, 2004
Hyllus C. L. Koch, 1846
Hypoblemum Peckham & Peckham, 1886
Icius Simon, 1876
Idastrandia Strand, 1929
Ilargus Simon, 1901
Imperceptus Prószyński, 1992
Indomarengo Benjamin, 2004
Indopadilla Caleb & Sankaran, 2019, considered close to Padillothorax
Iona Peckham & Peckham, 1886
Iranattus Prószyński, 1992, including Monomotapa Wesołowska, 2000
Irura Peckham & Peckham, 1901
Itata Peckham & Peckham, 1894
Jacksonoides Wanless, 1988
Jaluiticola Roewer, 1944
Jotus L. Koch, 1881
Judalana Rix, 1999
Junxattus Prószyński & Deeleman-Reinhold, 2012, included in Laufeia by Zhang & Maddison (2015)
Kakameganula Wesołowska, 2020
Kalcerrytus Galiano, 2000
Katya Prószyński & Deeleman-Reinhold, 2010
Kima Peckham & Peckham, 1902
Kupiuka Ruiz, 2010
Lagnus L. Koch, 1879
Lakarobius Berry, Beatty & Prószyński, 1998
Lamottella Rollard & Wesołowska, 2002
Langelurillus Próchniewicz, 1994
Langerra Żabka, 1985
Langona Simon, 1901
Laufeia Simon, 1889
Lauharulla Keyserling, 1883
Leikung Benjamin, 2004
Lepidemathis Simon, 1903
Leptathamas Balogh, 1980
Leptofreya Edwards, 2015
Leptorchestes Thorell, 1870
Leviea Maddison & Szűts, 2019
Ligonipes Karsch, 1878
Ligurra Simon, 1903
Longarenus Simon, 1903
Lophostica Simon, 1902
Lurio Simon, 1901
Lystrocteisa Simon, 1884
Mabellina Chickering, 1946
Macaroeris Wunderlich, 1992
Madhyattus Prószyński, 1992
Maeota Simon, 1901
Maevia C. L. Koch, 1846
Magyarus Żabka, 1985
Maileus Peckham & Peckham, 1907
Malloneta Simon, 1902
Mantisatta Warburton, 1900
Mantius Thorell, 1891
Manzuma Azarkina, 2020
Maratus Karsch, 1878
Marchena Peckham & Peckham, 1909
Marengo Peckham & Peckham, 1892
Margaromma Keyserling, 1882
Marma Simon, 1902
Marpissa C. L. Koch, 1846
Marusyllus Prószyński, 2016, separated from Yllenus in 2016
Matagaia Ruiz, Brescovit & Freitas, 2007
Mburuvicha Scioscia, 1993
Megafreya Edwards, 2015
Megaloastia Żabka, 1995
Mendoza Peckham & Peckham, 1894
Menemerus Simon, 1868
Messua Peckham & Peckham, 1896
Metacyrba F. O. Pickard-Cambridge, 1901
Metaphidippus F. O. Pickard-Cambridge, 1901
Mexcala Peckham & Peckham, 1902
Mexigonus Edwards, 2003
Microbianor Logunov, 2000
Mikrus Wesołowska, 2001
Mirandia Badcock, 1932
Modunda Simon, 1901
Mogrus Simon, 1882
Monaga Chickering, 1946
Mopiopia Simon, 1902
Mopsolodes Żabka, 1991
Mopsus Karsch, 1878
Myrmage Prószyński, 2016, separated from Myrmarachne in 2016
Myrmagua Prószyński, 2016, separated from Myrmarachne in 2016
Myrmanu Prószyński, 2016, separated from Myrmarachne in 2016
Myrmapana Prószyński, 2016, separated from Myrmarachne in 2016
Myrmapeni Prószyński, 2016, separated from Myrmarachne in 2016
Myrmaplata Prószyński, 2016, separated from Myrmarachne in 2016
Myrmarachne MacLeay, 1839
Myrmatheca Prószyński, 2016, separated from Myrmarachne in 2016
Myrmele Prószyński, 2016, separated from Myrmarachne in 2016
Nagaina Peckham & Peckham, 1896
Nandicius Prószyński, 2016, separated from Pseudicius in 2016
Nannenus Simon, 1902
Naphrys Edwards, 2003
Napoca Simon, 1901
Natta Karsch, 1879
Naubolus Simon, 1901
Neaetha Simon, 1884
Nebridia Simon, 1902, included in Amphidraus by Zhang & Maddison (2015)
Neon Simon, 1876
Neonella Gertsch, 1936
Nepalicius Prószyński, 2016, separated from Pseudicius in 2016
Nicylla Thorell, 1890, included in Thiania by Zhang & Maddison (2015)
Nigorella Wesołowska & Tomasiewicz, 2008
Nimbarus Rollard & Wesołowska, 2002
Nungia Żabka, 1985
Nycerella Galiano, 1982
Ocrisiona Simon, 1901
Ogdenia Peckham & Peckham, 1908
Ohilimia Strand, 1911
Okinawicius Prószyński, 2016, separated from Pseudicius in 2016
Omoedus Thorell, 1881
Onofre Ruiz & Brescovit, 2007
Opisthoncana Strand, 1913
Opisthoncus L. Koch, 1880
Orcevia Thorell, 1890, included in Laufeia by Zhang & Maddison (2015)
Orientattus Caleb, 2020
Orienticius Prószyński, 2016, separated from Pseudicius in 2016
Orsima Simon, 1901
Orthrus Simon, 1900
Osericta Simon, 1901
Pachomius Peckham & Peckham, 1896
Pachyballus Simon, 1900
Pachyonomastus Caporiacco, 1947
Padilla Peckham & Peckham, 1894
Padillothorax Simon, 1901, included in Stagetillus in 2015
Panachraesta Simon, 1900, included in Myrmarachne in 2015
Pancorius Simon, 1902
Papuamyr Maddison & Szűts, 2019
Papuaneon Maddison, 2016
Parabathippus Zhang & Maddison, 2012
Paradamoetas Peckham & Peckham, 1885
Paraharmochirus Szombathy, 1915
Paraheliophanus Clark & Benoit, 1977
Parahelpis Gardzińska & Żabka, 2010
Parajotus Peckham & Peckham, 1903
Paramaevia Barnes, 1955, included in Maevia in 2015
Paramarpissa F. O. Pickard-Cambridge, 1901
Paraneaetha Denis, 1947
Paraphidippus F. O. Pickard-Cambridge, 1901
Paraphilaeus Żabka, 2003
Paraplatoides Żabka, 1992
Paraplexippus Franganillo, 1930
Parasaitis Bryant, 1950
Parnaenus Peckham & Peckham, 1896
Parvattus Zhang & Maddison, 2012
Peckhamia Simon, 1900
Pelegrina Franganillo, 1930
Pellenes Simon, 1876
Pellolessertia Strand, 1929
Penionomus Simon, 1903
Pensacola Peckham & Peckham, 1885
Pensacolops Bauab, 1983
Peplometus Simon, 1900
Petemathis Prószyński & Deeleman-Reinhold, 2012
Phanias F. O. Pickard-Cambridge, 1901
Phanuelus Caleb & Mathai, 2015
Pharacocerus Simon, 1902
Phasmolia Zhang & Maddison, 2012
Phaulostylus Simon, 1902
Phiale C. L. Koch, 1846
Phidippus C. L. Koch, 1846
Philaeus Thorell, 1869
Philates Simon, 1900
Philira Edwards, 2015
Phintella Strand, 1906
Phintelloides Kanesharatnam & Benjamin, 2019
Phlegra Simon, 1876
Phyaces Simon, 1902
Pignus Wesołowska, 2000
Piranthus Thorell, 1895
Planiemen Wesołowska & van Harten, 2007
Platycryptus Hill, 1979
Platypsecas Caporiacco, 1955
Plesiopiuka Ruiz, 2010
Plexippoides Prószyński, 1984
Plexippus C. L. Koch, 1846
Pochyta Simon, 1901
Pochytoides Wesołowska, 2020
Poecilorchestes Simon, 1901
Polemus Simon, 1902
Popcornella Zhang & Maddison, 2012
Porius Thorell, 1892
Poultonella Peckham & Peckham, 1909
Pristobaeus Simon, 1902
Prostheclina Keyserling, 1882
Proszynskia Kanesharatnam & Benjamin, 2019
Proszynskiana Logunov, 1996
Psecas C. L. Koch, 1850
Psenuc Prószyński, 2016, separated from Pseudicius in 2016
Pseudamycus Simon, 1885
Pseudemathis Simon, 1902
Pseudeuophrys Dahl, 1912
Pseudicius Simon, 1885
Pseudocorythalia Caporiacco, 1938
Pseudofluda Mello-Leitão, 1928
Pseudomogrus Simon, 1937, included in Yllenus in 2015
Pseudopartona Caporiacco, 1954
Pseudoplexippus Caporiacco, 1947
Ptocasius Simon, 1885
Pungalina Richardson, 2013
Pystira Simon, 1901, included in Omoedus in 2015
Rafalus Prószyński, 1999
Ragatinus Dawidowicz & Wesołowska, 2016
Rarahu Berland, 1929
Rhene Thorell, 1869
Rhetenor Simon, 1902
Rhombonotus L. Koch, 1879
Rhondes Simon, 1901
Rhyphelia Simon, 1902
Rishaschia Makhan, 2006
Rogmocrypta Simon, 1900
Rudakius Prószyński, 2016, separated from Pseudicius in 2016
Rudra Peckham & Peckham, 1885
Rumburak Wesołowska, Azarkina & Russell-Smith, 2014
Saaristattus Logunov & Azarkina, 2008
Sadies Wanless, 1984
Saitidops Simon, 1901
Saitis Simon, 1876
Saitissus Roewer, 1938
Salticus Latreille, 1804
Sandalodes Keyserling, 1883
Saphrys Zhang & Maddison, 2015
Saraina Wanless & Clark, 1975
Saratus Otto & Hill, 2017
Sassacus Peckham & Peckham, 1895
Schenkelia Lessert, 1927
Sebastira Simon, 1901
Selimus Peckham & Peckham, 1901
Semnolius Simon, 1902
Semora Peckham & Peckham, 1892
Semorina Simon, 1901
Servaea Simon, 1888
Sibianor Logunov, 2001
Sidusa Peckham & Peckham, 1895
Sigytes Simon, 1902
Siler Simon, 1889
Simaetha Thorell, 1881
Simaethula Simon, 1902
Sobasina Simon, 1898
Soesilarishius Makhan, 2007
Sondra Wanless, 1988
Spadera Peckham & Peckham, 1894, separated from Pseudicius in 2017
Spilargis Simon, 1902
Stagetillus Simon, 1885
Stenaelurillus Simon, 1886, including Microheros Wesołowska & Cumming, 1999
Stertinius Simon, 1890
Stoidis Simon, 1901
Sumampattus Galiano, 1983
Synageles Simon, 1876
Synagelides Strand, 1906
Tacuna Peckham & Peckham, 1901
Taivala Peckham & Peckham, 1907
Talavera Peckham & Peckham, 1909
Tanzania Koçak & Kemal, 2008
Tapsatella Rubio & Stolar, 2020
Tara Peckham & Peckham, 1886
Tarkas Edwards, 2015
Tarne Simon, 1886
Tarodes Pocock, 1899
Tasa Wesołowska, 1981, replacement name for Thianella Schenkel, 1963
Tauala Wanless, 1988
Telamonia Thorell, 1887
Terralonus Maddison, 1996
Thammaca Simon, 1901
Theriella Braul & Lise, 1996
Thiania C. L. Koch, 1846
Thianitara Simon, 1903, included in Thiania by Zhang & Maddison, 2015
Thiratoscirtus Simon, 1886
Thorelliola Strand, 1942
Thyene Simon, 1885
Thyenula Simon, 1902
Tisaniba Zhang & Maddison, 2014
Toxeus C. L. Koch, 1846, included in Myrmarachne in 2015
Triggella Edwards, 2015
Trite Simon, 1885
Truncattus Zhang & Maddison, 2012
Trydarssus Galiano, 1995
Tullgrenella Mello-Leitão, 1941
Tulpius Peckham & Peckham, 1896
Tusitala Peckham & Peckham, 1902
Tutelina Simon, 1901
Tuvaphantes Logunov, 1993
Tylogonus Simon, 1902
Udvardya Prószyński, 1992
Ugandinella Wesołowska, 2006
Uluella Chickering, 1946
Ureta Wesołowska & Haddad, 2013
Uroballus Simon, 1902
Urogelides Żabka, 2009
Uxuma Simon, 1902
Vailimia Kammerer, 2006
Variratina Zhang & Maddison, 2012
Viciria Thorell, 1877
Viribestus Zhang & Maddison, 2012
Viroqua Peckham & Peckham, 1901
Wallaba Mello-Leitão, 1940, considered a synonym of Sidusa by Zhang & Maddison, 2015
Wedoquella Galiano, 1984
Wesolowskana Koçak & Kemal, 2008
Xanthofreya Edwards, 2015
Xenocytaea Berry, Beatty & Prószyński, 1998
Xuriella Wesołowska & Russell-Smith, 2000
Yacuitella Galiano, 1999
Yaginumaella Prószyński, 1979
Yepoella Galiano, 1970
Yimbulunga Wesołowska, Azarkina & Russell-Smith, 2014
Yllenus Simon, 1868
Zabkattus Zhang & Maddison, 2012
Zebraplatys Żabka, 1992
Zenodorus Peckham & Peckham, 1886, included in Omoedus in 2015
Zeuxippus Thorell, 1891
Zygoballus Peckham & Peckham, 1885

Salticinae incertae sedis

Adoxotoma Simon, 1909
Albionella Chickering, 1946
Ananeon Richardson, 2013
Aruana Strand, 1911
Bokokius Roewer, 1942
Cavillator Wesołowska, 2000
Epidelaxia Simon, 1902
Flacillula Strand, 1932
Gambaquezonia Barrion & Litsinger, 1995
Ghumattus Prószyński, 1992
Giuiria Strand, 1906
Grayenulla Żabka, 1992
Haplopsecas Caporiacco, 1955
Hasarinella Wesołowska, 2012
Heliophanoides Prószyński, 1992
Hinewaia Żabka & Pollard, 2002
Hisukattus Galiano, 1987
Homalattus White, 1841
Iberattus Prószyński, 2018, detailed placement uncertain
Jajpurattus Prószyński, 1992
Lechia Żabka, 1985
Leuserattus Prószyński & Deeleman-Reinhold, 2012
Ligdus Thorell, 1895
Maddisonia Żabka, 2014
Maltecora Simon, 1909
Microhasarius Simon, 1902
Muziris Simon, 1901
Necatia Özdikmen, 2007
Pachypoessa Simon, 1902
Padillothorus Prószyński, 2018, separated from Stagetillus in 2018; detailed placement uncertain
Panysinus Simon, 1901
Phausina Simon, 1902
Pilia Simon, 1902
Poessa Simon, 1902
Proszynellus Patoleta & Żabka, 2015
Pseudomaevia Rainbow, 1920
Pseudosynagelides Żabka, 1991
Salpesia Simon, 1901
Sarindoides Mello-Leitão, 1922
Simaethulina Wesołowska, 2012
Similaria Prószyński, 1992
Stergusa Simon, 1889
Tamigalesus Żabka, 1988
Tatari Berland, 1938
Thyenillus Simon, 1909
Toticoryx Rollard & Wesołowska, 2002
Udalmella Galiano, 1994
Yogetor Wesołowska & Russell-Smith, 2000
Zulunigma Wesołowska & Cumming, 2011

Salticidae incertae sedis
Ancepitilobus Richardson, 2016, taxonomic relationships unknown
Arachnotermes Mello-Leitão, 1928
Ballagascar Azarkina & Haddad , 2020
Ballognatha Caporiacco, 1935, nomen dubium
Capeyorkia Richardson, 2016, taxonomic relationships unknown
Ceglusa Thorell, 1895
Clynotoides Mello-Leitão, 1944
Dolichoneon Caporiacco, 1935
Dendroicius Lin & Li, 2020, taxonomic relationships not stated
Hyctiota Strand, 1911
Stenodeza Simon, 1900
Thianella Strand, 1907, nomen dubium
Vatovia Caporiacco, 1940

References

 
Salticidae
Salticidae
.